Shokiwala is a 2022 Kannada-language  romantic action drama film directed by Jocky. It stars Ajay Rao, Sanjana Anand in the lead roles and Giri Shivanna, Sharat Lohitashwa, Tabala Nani, Pramod Shetty, Aruna Balraj and Lasya Nagraj in supporting roles.

Plot

Cast 

 Ajay Rao as Krishna
 Sanjana Anand as Radha
 Giri Shivanna as Balu
 Sharat Lohitashwa as Narsimhe
 Tabala Nani  as  Linga
 Pramod Shetty as S. P.  Prathap
 Aruna Balraj as Tayavva
 Lasya Nagraj as Mahadevamma

Soundtrack

Release
The film was released on 29th April 2022.

Reception 
It opened with mixed reviews from critics appreciating screenplay and performance of cast but was criticised for predictability and lack of  strong script.

References

External links
Shokiwala at IMDb